Pirates of the Caribbean: Dead Man's Chest is the soundtrack for the Disney film of the same title, Pirates of the Caribbean: Dead Man's Chest. The score was composed by Hans Zimmer in 2006. Zimmer has noted that no electric guitars were used in the score:

Response
The soundtrack’was generally praised and contrasted with the one for the previous installment of the franchise.

Track listing

* Only on the Best Buy Exclusive (Walt Disney Records 61593-7) 
** Only on the second disc of the Japanese Exclusive (Avex Group AVCW 12505-6/B)

Credits
Music Composed by Hans Zimmer
Score Overproduced by Hans Zimmer and Bob "Cut 'Em Up" Badami
Executive Soundtrack Album Producers: Jerry Bruckheimer and Gore Verbinski
Executive in Charge of Music and Soundtrack for Walt Disney Pictures and the Buena Vista Music Group: Mitchell "Swabby" Leib
Music Supervisor: Bob "Cut 'Em Up" Badami
Music Creative/Marketing for the Buena Vista Motion Pictures Group: Glen Lajeski
Executive in Charge of Music Production for the Buena Vista Motion Pictures Group: Monica "Blackheart" Zierhut
Director of Soundtracks for the Buena Vista Music Group: Desirée "Pillage" Craig-Ramos
Additional Music by
Lorne "Shiver Me Timbers" Balfe
Tom "Chum Bucket" Gire
Nick "The Admiral" Glennie-Smith
Henry "Jolly Swordfish" Jackman
Trevor "Scurvy Dog" Morris
John "Red Beard" Sponsler
Geoff "Broadside" Zanelli

References

External links
 Behind the Scenes of scoring Pirates 2

2006 soundtrack albums
2000s film soundtrack albums
Classical music soundtracks
Walt Disney Records soundtracks
Hans Zimmer soundtracks
Dead Man's Chest
Disney film soundtracks